Haemanota improvisa is a moth of the family Erebidae. It was described by Paul Dognin in 1923. It is found in French Guiana.

References

 Natural History Museum Lepidoptera generic names catalog

Haemanota
Moths described in 1923